Hornbostel is a German surname. Notable people with the surname include:

 Chuck Hornbostel (1911–1989), American middle-distance runner
 Erich Moritz von Hornbostel (1877–1935), Austrian ethnomusicologist
 Hornbostel-Sachs, a classification system for musical instruments
 Henry Hornbostel (1867–1961), American architect

German-language surnames